The Ministry of Finance and Treasury is a government ministry of the Solomon Islands responsible for public finances. The ministry is located in Honiara.

Ministers
Willie Betu, 1975-1976
Benedict Kinika, 1976-1981
Bartholomew Ulufa’alu, 1981-1984
George Kejoa, 1985-1989
Christopher Abe, 1989-1993
Andrew Nori, 1993-1994
Christopher Abe, 1994-1996
Solomon Mamaloni, 1996
Christopher Abe, 1996-1997
Michael Maina, 1997
Manasseh Sogavare, 1997-1998
Bartholomew Ulufa’alu, 1998-1999
Alpha Kimata, 1999-2000
Snyder Rini, 2000-2001
Michael Maina, 2001-2002
Laurie Chan, 2002
Snyder Rini, 2002-2003
Francis Zama, 2003-2005
Peter Boyers, 2005-2006
Bartholomew Ulufa’alu, 2006
Gordon Darcy Lilo, 2006-2007
Francis Zama, 2007
Snyder Rini, 2007-2010
Francis Billy Hilly, 2010
Gordon Darcy Lilo, 2010-2011
Rick Hou, 2011-2014
Snyder Rini, 2014-2017
John Maneniaru, 2017
Manasseh Sogavare, 2017-2019
Harry Kuma, 2019 -

See also
Cabinet of the Solomon Islands
Economy of the Solomon Islands

References

External links
 Ministry of Finance and Treasury

Government of the Solomon Islands
Solomon Islands
Economy of the Solomon Islands
1975 establishments in the Solomon Islands